Philip Westphal (178216 March 1880) was an admiral in the Royal Navy. He was designated a Person of National Historic Significance for Canada in 1945.

Biography 
Philip Westphal was born in 1782, the son of George Westphal and younger brother of Admiral George Augustus Westphal. He entered the North American station of the Royal Navy in 1794. Westphal served in North America on the Asia for three years, until 1800.

In 1806 his ship captured the French schooner Belle Poule and Westphal refitted the ship and captained it back to England in an unofficial capacity. When he returned, the British Admiralty declined to make his rank official and he remained a lieutenant. George Cockburn placed Westphal in service on Cockburn's flagship in January 1815 and he was promoted to commander on 23 June. He reached a 'post rank' on 22 July 1830 and retired in 1847. While on the retired list, he was promoted to rear admiral (27 September 1855), vice-admiral (4 October 1862), and admiral (2 April 1866). He died on 16 March 1880. When he died, Westphal was the oldest officer in the Royal Navy.

References 

1782 births
1880 deaths
Persons of National Historic Significance (Canada)
Royal Navy admirals